Norteño (Spanish: "northerner") may refer to:

 Norteño (music) is a style of Mexican music related to polka and corridos
 Norteño refers to the people originally from Northern Mexico and Southwestern U.S.
 Norteño (band) is a tango nuevo band from Ottawa, Ontario, Canada
 Norteño is an alcoholic beverage (aguardiente), from Ecuador
 Norteño refers to the people and the culture of north central and north eastern New Mexico.
 The Norteños are a large organization of largely Mexican-American street gangs in the United States

Spanish words and phrases